Limonar is a municipality and town in the Matanzas Province of Cuba.

Overview
The municipality is divided into the barrios of Canímar, Guamacaro, Caoba, Sumidero, Coliseo, and San Miguel.

Established in 1876 as Guamacaro, the name was changed to Limonar in the 1950s, when it achieved municipality status. Limonar is the hometown of jumper Javier Sotomayor; jumper Marino Drake; fine art painter Aimeé García Marrero; as well as professional baseball player Silvio García.

Demographics
In 2004, the municipality of Limonar had a population of 25,421.

See also
Municipalities of Cuba
List of cities in Cuba

References

External links

Populated places in Matanzas Province